The 24th Georgia Infantry Regiment was an infantry regiment in the Confederate States Army during the American Civil War. The regiment was part of Thomas Cobb's brigade at the Battle of Fredericksburg.

Organization 
The 24th Infantry Regiment, organized during the summer of 1861, recruited its members in Franklin, White, Banks, Towns, Rabun, Gwinnett, Elbert, Hall, and Habersham counties. The field officers were Colonels Robert McMillan and C. C. Sanders, Lieutenant Colonels Joseph N. Chandler and Thomas E. Winn, and Majors Robert E. McMillan and Frederick C. Smith. After serving in the Department of North Carolina, the unit moved to Virginia where it was brigaded under Generals Howell Cobb, T. R. R. Cobb, Wofford, and DuBose.

Service record 
The 24th Infantry Regiment fought in the difficult campaigns of the Army of Northern Virginia from the Seven Days Battles to Gettysburg, then moved to Georgia with Longstreet. The 24th was not engaged at Chickamauga, but did see action in the Knoxville Campaign. The regiment returned to Virginia and participated in the conflicts at The Wilderness, Spotsylvania, and Cold Harbor, was active in the Shenandoah Valley, and ended the war at Appomattox.

Soon after being mustered into Confederate service the regiment was moved to Lynchburg, Virginia. Within a week of arriving there, however, it was ordered to Goldsborough, North Carolina. There it joined the Department of North Carolina. The unit remained there until early in 1862. Returning to Virginia, the unit was placed in the Army of Northern Virginia. It served in that army until the summer of 1863. At that time it was moved to Georgia where it served in the Army of Tennessee. It next saw service in the Department of East Tennessee. In the spring of 1864 the regiment returned to the Army of Northern Virginia, remaining in that army until mid-summer 1864. It then moved to the Shenandoah Valley where it served in the Army of the Valley District. Finally, in December 1864, the unit returned to the Army of Northern Virginia, serving in that army for the remainder of the war.

Listed below are the specific higher command assignments of the regiment.

Sep 30, 1861 - Attached, Coast Defense, Department of North Carolina
Apr 30, 1862 - Cobb's Brigade, McLaws' Division, Right of Position, Army of Northern Virginia
May 21, 1862 - Cobb's Brigade, Third Division, Army of Northern Virginia
Jul 21, 1862 - Second Brigade, McLaws' Division, Longstreet's Corps, Army of Northern Virginia
Sep 20, 1862 - Cobb's Brigade, McLaws' Division, Longstreet's Corps, Army of Northern Virginia
Dec 10, 1862 - Cobb's Brigade, McLaws' Division, First Corps, Army of Northern Virginia
May 1, 1863 - Wofford's Brigade, McLaws' Division, First Corps, Army of Northern Virginia
Oct 01, 1863 - Wofford's Brigade, McLaws' Division, Longstreet's Corps, Army of Tennessee
Dec 01, 1863 - Wofford's Brigade, McLaws' Division, Department of East Tennessee
May 1, 1864 - Wofford's Brigade, Kershaw's Division, First Corps, Army of Northern Virginia
Oct 01, 1864 - Wofford's Brigade, Kershaw's Division, Second Corps, Army of the Valley District
Dec 31, 1864 - Wofford's Brigade, Kershaw's Division, First Corps, Army of Northern Virginia
Apr 01, 1865 - DuBose's Brigade, Kershaw's Division, First Corps, Army of Northern Virginia

Engagements 
Skirmish, Warwick Road, Va. Apr 05, 1862
Siege, Yorktown, Va.  Apr 05 - May 4, 1862
Engagement, Lee's Mills, Burnt Chimneys, Dam No. 1, Va. Apr 16, 1862
Evacuation, Yorktown, Va.  May 4, 1862
Skirmish, Ellison's Mills near Mechanicsville, Va. May 23, 1862
Battle, Seven Pines, Fair Oaks, Va. May 31 - Jun 01, 1862
Seven Days Battles Jun 25 - Jul 01, 1862
Battle, Peach Orchard (Allen's Farm) near Fair Oaks Station Jun 29, 1862
Battle, Savage Station, Va.  Jun 29, 1862
Battle, Malvern Hill, Crew's Farm (Poindexter's Farm) Jul 01, 1862
Engagement, Malvern Hill, Va.  Aug 05, 1862
Campaign in Northern Virginia (Second Bull Run Campaign) Aug 16 - Sep 02, 1862
Maryland Campaign Sep 06 - Sep 22, 1862
Action, Maryland Heights, Md.  Sep 12 - Sep 13, 1862
Siege, Harper's Ferry, W. Va.  Sep 13 - Sep 15, 1862
Battle, Antietam, Sharpsburg, Md. Sep 16 - Sep 17, 1862
Operations in Loudoun, Fauquier, and Rappahannock Co, Va. Oct 26 - Nov 10, 1862
Battle, Fredericksburg, Va.  Dec 12 - Dec 15, 1862
Chancellorsville Campaign Apr 27 - May 6, 1863
Battle, Chancellorsville, Va.  May 1–5, 1863
Gettysburg Campaign Jun 03 - Aug 01, 1863
Battle, Gettysburg, Pa.  Jul 01 - Jul 03, 1863
Retreat to near Manassas Gap, Va.  Jul 05 - Jul 24, 1863
Skirmish near Manassas Gap, Va.  Jul 23, 1863
Battle, Chickamauga, Ga.  Sep 19 - Sep 21, 1863
Siege, Chattanooga, Tenn.  Sep 24 - Oct 30, 1863
Engagement, Wauhatchie, Tenn.  Oct 28 - Oct 29, 1863
Knoxville Campaign Nov 04 - Dec 23, 1863
Skirmish, Little River, Tenn. Nov 15, 1863
Siege, Knoxville, Tenn.  Nov 17 - Dec 04, 1863
Assault, Forts Saunders and Loudon, Knoxville, Tenn. Nov 29, 1863
Operations about Dandridge, Tenn.  Jan 16 - Jan 17, 1864
Wilderness Campaign May 4 - Jun 12, 1864
Battle, Wilderness, Va.  May 5–7, 1864
Battles about Spotsylvania Court House, Laurel Hill, Ni River, Fredericksburg Road, Va. May 8–21, 1864
Assault on the Salient, Spotsylvania Court House, Vs.  May 12, 1864
Operations on the line of the North Anna River, Va.  May 22–26, 1864
Operations on the line of the Pamunkey River, Va.  May 26–28, 1864
Operations on the line of the Totopotomoy River, Va.  May 28–31, 1864
Battles about Cold Harbor, Va.  Jun 01 - Jun 12, 1864
Assault, Petersburg, Va.  Jun 16, 1864
Siege Operations against Petersburg and Richmond, Va. Jun 16 - Jul ??, 1864
Assault, Petersburg, Va.  Jun 18, 1864
Sheridan's Campaign in the Shenandoah Valley, Va. Aug 07 - Nov 28, 1864
Engagement, Cedarville, Guard Hill (Front Royal), Va. Aug 16, 1864
Action, Bunker Hill, W. Va.  Sep 02 - Sep 03, 1864
Battle, Opequon, Winchester, Va. Sep 19, 1864
Battle, Fisher's Hill, Woodstock, Va. Sep 22, 1864
Battle, Cedar Creek, Middletown, Belle Grove, Va. Oct 19, 1864
Siege Operations against Petersburg and Richmond, Va.  Dec ??, 1864 - Apr 02, 1865
Appomattox Campaign Mar 28 - Apr 09, 1865
Engagement, Sailor's Creek, Va.  Apr 06, 1865
Engagement, Clover Hill, Appomattox Court House, Va.  Apr 09, 1865
Surrender, Appomattox Court House, Va. Apr 09, 1865

Casualties 
In April 1862, this regiment totaled 660 effectives, lost 43 percent of the 292 engaged at Crampton's Gap, and had four killed, 39 wounded, and two missing at Sharpsburg. It sustained 36 casualties at Fredericksburg, reported 14 killed and 73 wounded at Chancellorsville, and of the 303 at Gettysburg, 17 percent were disabled. Many were captured at Sayler's Creek and only four officers and 56 men surrendered on April 9, 1865.

In popular culture 
In the movie, Gods and Generals, it is identified as "Brigadier General Thomas R.R. Cobb's Irish Regiment, Georgia, C.S.A.".

See also 
List of Civil War regiments from Georgia

References 

Incorporates public domain text from the National Park Service Civil War Soldiers and Sailors System.

Military units and formations established in 1861
Military units and formations disestablished in 1865
Units and formations of the Confederate States Army from Georgia (U.S. state)
1861 establishments in Georgia (U.S. state)